Jodelle may refer to:

Family name 
 Étienne Jodelle (1532–1573), French dramatist and poet, was born in Paris of a noble family

Given name 
 The Adventures of Jodelle, a 1966 French erotic comic drawn by Guy Peellaert and scripted by Pierre Bartier
 Jodelle Ferland (born 1994), Canadian actress